Line 1 of CRT runs westwards from  to . Line 1 began operation on 28 July 2011.

It is the city's first all-heavy rail metro line and the second completed in Western China. Passenger capacity of the line is 36,000 passengers/hour/direction.

In 1992, the Chongqing government had signed a Build-Operate-Transfer in 1992 with a Hong Kong company, and provided the land for the project, but work ceased in 1997 due to legal issues. Work resumed on the first stretch of the line (from Chaotianmen to Shapingba) on 9 June 2007, and opened to limited operation on July 28. An extension from Shapingba to Daxuecheng (University Town) began in 2009 and opened on December 21, 2012 before receiving a short extension from Daxuecheng to Jiandingpo a year later. And an extension, running from Jiandingpo to Bishan also opened on December 30, 2019, making Line 1 the first CRT line to reach areas outside Metropolitan Chongqing. The latest extension from Xiaoshizi to Chaotianmen has been opened on 31 December 2020, making Line 1 a completely finished subway line.

Line 1 has 25 stations, including from east to west: Chaotianmen, Xiaoshizi, Jiaochangkou, Qixinggang, Lianglukou, Eling, Daping, Shiyoulu, Xietaizi, Shiqiaopu, Gaomiaocun, Majiayan, Xiaolongkan, Shapingba, Yanggongqiao, Lieshimu, Ciqikou, Shijingpo, Shuangbei, Laijiaqiao, Weidianyuan, Chenjiaqiao, Daxuecheng (University Town), Jiandingpo and Bishan stations.

Line 1 has transfer interchange stations with Line 6 at Xiaoshizi and Line 2 at Jiaochangkou in Jiefangbei CBD and at Daping and Line 3 at Lianglukou,  which is near Chongqing railway station in central Yuzhong. Line 1 is also transferable with the Loop Line at Shapingba, although out-of-station transfer is currently needed due to construction setbacks on the interchange channel and concourse connecting the two subway lines.

Opening timeline

Service routes
  – 
  –

Current stations

Notes

References

 
Railway lines opened in 2011
2011 establishments in China